Bhadrapur Airport , also known as Chandragadhi Airport, is a domestic airport located in Bhadrapur, primarily serving Jhapa and Ilam districts in Province No. 1, Nepal. The Civil Aviation Authority of Nepal considers it an important hub for passengers entering Nepal from the north eastern states of India, Bhutan and Bangladesh.

History

In the October of 1963, it was reported that the Government of Nepal was constructing an aerodrome in Bhadrapur, Jhapa with Chinese help. The initial project was for military purpose. And that Pakistan had expressed its desire to link it with an air service from Dhaka, Bhadrapur, Kathmandu, Karachi. Photovoltaic cells were used for the first time in Nepal at this airport for running navigation equipment. 

The airport has served as an airfield since November 1963. Originally a grass runway, it was re-laid in concrete and has been extended several times. The airport was named "Airport of the Year 2013" by the Civil Aviation Authority of Nepal. On 31 January 2018, Prime Minister K.P. Oli inaugurated a newly built RNAV system at the airport, making it capable of handling night flights.

Facilities
The airport is located at  elevation. All commercial airlines operate through one small terminal of Bhadrapur Airport.

Airlines and destinations

References

External links
 

Airports in Nepal
Koshi Province
1963 establishments in Nepal
Buildings and structures in Jhapa District